Gate City Historic District is a national historic district located at Gate City, Scott County, Virginia. It contains 47 contributing buildings in the central business district of Gate City. Most contributing resources consist of commercial, residential, and governmental buildings dating from the late-19th and early-20th centuries. They are in a variety of popular architectural styles including Greek Revival, Colonial Revival, Tudor Revival, and Bungalow. Notable buildings include the Scott County Courthouse (1829), Library (c. 1940), Gate City Movie Theater (c. 1925), and Jail (c. 1829).

It was listed on the National Register of Historic Places in 2010.

References

Historic districts on the National Register of Historic Places in Virginia
Colonial Revival architecture in Virginia
Greek Revival architecture in Virginia
Tudor Revival architecture in Virginia
Buildings and structures in Scott County, Virginia
National Register of Historic Places in Scott County, Virginia